Valery Nikolayevich Yardy (18 January 1948 – 1 August 1994) was a Russian road cyclist who competed in the 1968 and 1972 Olympics. In 1968 he placed 17th individually and ninth with the Soviet team. Four years later he failed to finish his individual race, but won a gold medal with the team. Yardy won another team gold medal at the 1970 World Championships.

References

External links
 Biography at the website of the Chuvash Republic's administration

1948 births
1994 deaths
People from Chuvashia
Soviet male cyclists
Cyclists at the 1968 Summer Olympics
Cyclists at the 1972 Summer Olympics
Olympic cyclists of the Soviet Union
Olympic gold medalists for the Soviet Union
Armed Forces sports society athletes
Olympic medalists in cycling
Medalists at the 1972 Summer Olympics
UCI Road World Champions (elite men)
Sportspeople from Chuvashia